Senator Schrader may refer to:

Kurt Schrader (born 1951), Oregon State Senate
Martha Schrader (born 1953), Oregon State Senate